In 1940, a study of 314 women in New Zealand and Australia was done. Most of the women in the study were middle class, conservative, Protestant and white. The study found that 183 participated in sport.  The nineteenth most popular sport that these women participated in was surfing, with 2 having played the sport.  The sport was tied with cricket, mountaineering, and rowing.

Isabel Letham was one of the early icons of women's surfing in Australia.  She inspired several women including Pam Burridge.

During the 1970s, 1980s and 1990s, women's surfing saw a large expansion in the number of competitors. Since then one-third of Australia's Surfing population are female.

Women's competitive surfing did not develop as quickly as men. This is due to many female competitions being cancelled at short notice leading to irregular competitions. Women also earned considerably less than men.  In the 1984 Beaurepaire Open, women competed for A$5,000, whilst men A$95,000.

Surf lifesaving in Australia banned women from rescue work and competition in 1914: "conquering the sea was a man's prerogative and women were deemed physically too weak to carry a heavy belt and line or to swim competitively in surf races" (Booth, 2007).

Australia has produced several women's world champions including Pam Burridge, Pauline Menczer and Wendy Botha.

Pam Burridge was one of the most influential women in Australian surfing to push for equality between the men's and women's parts of the sport.  She competed in an era when men and women did not earn comparable prize money.  She shocked many in the surfing community by chasing after and successfully surfing big waves, waves women were typically not known to surf.

Notable Women in Australian Surfing 
 Pam Burridge
 Pauline Menczer
 Wendy Botha

Female Australian World Title Holders 

 1989: Wendy Botha
 1990: Pam Burridge
 1991: Wendy Botha
 1992: Wendy Botha
 1993: Pauline Menczer
 1998: Layne Beachley
 1999: Layne Beachley
 2000: Layne Beachley
 2001: Layne Beachley
 2002: Layne Beachley
 2003: Layne Beachley
 2005: Chelsea Georgeson
 2006: Layne Beachley
 2007: Stephanie Gilmore
 2008: Stephanie Gilmore
 2009: Stephanie Gilmore
 2010: Stephanie Gilmore
 2012: Stephanie Gilmore
 2014: Stephanie Gilmore

Constraints for Women in Surfing 

In 2012, a study was completed by Laura Fendt & Erica Wilson which looked at the motivations and constraints experienced by women in relation to surfing and surf-related travel. This study was conducted by facilitating in-depth interviews with 20 women surfers in New South Wales, Australia. The interview was structured around questions designed to provoke a more in-depth response from participants. On completion of the study the following table of results was constructed using the responses of the 20 interviewed women.

 The numbers in this column do not equal 20 as each woman has stated several constraints

Performance Differences Between Men and Women 

Due to the natural differences in strength between men and women, competitions have always been segregated between the sexes. The main aspect of surfing which gives male athletes an advantage in competition is the pop up phase. The pop-up movement occurs when the surfer has gained enough speed in the paddling stage to catch the wave and is complete. Once this momentum has been gained an explosive movement occurs as the surfer pushes off the board to stand on their feet.

A study was conducted at the California State University to measure the exact advantage that men had over women in this pop-up stage. Men and women of the same ages were asked to perform three pop-ups on a plate that would measure relative peak force, relative rate of force development, peak velocity, rate of velocity development and relative power. In all of these criteria, men produced significantly better results.

It was then concluded from these results that female surfers are not physically able to perform the pop-up action with forces equal to that of their male competitors.

See also 

 Surfing Australia
 Surfing in Australia
 Women's surfing

Notes

References

Bibliography 

 

Surfing in Australia
Surfing
Women's surfing